Tara Buckman is an American retired television and film actress. Her active career was mainly confined to the late 1970s to the mid-1990s. Though never reaching feature status, Buckman was nonetheless a regular guest star on many television series. She also appeared in minor roles in feature films.

Early life 
Buckman was an Army brat whose longest time living in one house was two years until her family moved to Virginia Beach, Virginia when she was a teenager. Buckman was a drum major, the first in her schools history, and attended and graduated from Princess Anne High School in 1974. While she was a waitress in a hotel dining room in Norfolk, Virginia, producer James Goldstone saw her, and he later offered her a part in the film Rollercoaster. Three months later, she moved to Los Angeles. After arriving there, she gained a contract with Universal Studios with Goldstone's assistance.

Career

Television 
Buckman portrayed Officer Brandy Ames in The Misadventures of Sheriff Lobo and Cat Hellman in The Master. She is also remembered for her guest appearances in episodes of such 1970s and 1980s television fare as The Rockford Files, Kojak, CHiPs, The Hardy Boys Mysteries, Quincy, M.E., Buck Rogers in the 25th Century and Brave New World. She also appeared in the 1979 television movies Death Car on the Freeway and The Man in the Santa Claus Suit, and portrayed Norma Kirkland on the daytime drama Days of Our Lives in 1984-1985.

In film 
Often cast in minor roles in larger budget films, Buckman appeared in the Burt Reynolds vehicles Hooper (1978) and The Cannonball Run (1981). Buckman was generally offered largely dimensionless and decorative parts, such as a rollercoaster attendant in the disaster film Rollercoaster (1977), and "Lamborghini Girl #2" (alongside Adrienne Barbeau) in The Cannonball Run.

Buckman also appeared in several b movies from the late-1970s through to the mid-1990s. She appeared in a rape/murder scene, in which her top was torn open and her throat was slit by a man dressed as Santa Claus in the 1984 controversial horror film Silent Night, Deadly Night. Her most recent major role was as Dr. Julie Casserly in Xtro II: The Second Encounter (1991), and her other credits include the films Snowballing (1984), Never Too Young to Die (1986), Terminal Exposure (1987), Blue Angel Cafe (1989), High Finance Woman (1990), and The Marilyn Diaries (1990) alongside porn star Marilyn Chambers.

Filmography

Film

Television

References

External links

People from Pensacola, Florida
Living people
American film actresses
American television actresses
Actresses from Los Angeles
20th-century American actresses
Actresses from Virginia
Princess Anne High School alumni
21st-century American women
Year of birth missing (living people)